az-Zahiriyah is a village in northern Aleppo Governorate, northwestern Syria.

The village administratively belongs to Nahiya Sawran in Azaz District. Nearby localities include Sawran  to the southwest and Ihtaimlat  to the southeast. In the 2004 census, az-Zahiriyah had a population of 194.

References

Populated places in Azaz District
Villages in Aleppo Governorate